Stillman & Eastwick-Field Partnership (SEF) was an architects' firm based in London, founded in 1949 by the architects John Stillman and John and Elizabeth Eastwick-Field, a married couple. The firm made notable contributions to Britain's post-war reconstruction, first with schools and, hospitals, later with housing and university accommodation.

 Much of the firm's output displays a restrained
'New Brutalist' manner with robust detailing in brick and exposed concrete. SEF closed in 2004, and was succeeded by the architects' firms Bennett SEF Ltd / TP Bennetts LLP (formerly TP Bennett).

Elizabeth Eastwick-Field (née Gee) was born on 21 November 1919, and died on 8 March 2003 aged 83. John Eastwick-Field, OBE, was born on 6 December 1919, and died on 30 March 2003 aged 83. John Stillman was born in 1920 and died 19 July 2021.

The firm's three founding partners met in 1937 when studying at the Bartlett School of Architecture, University College London.

John Eastwick-Field was tutor at the School of Architecture at the Architectural Association from 1946 to 1956, sitting on the council there from 1956 to 1958, and becoming President of the school in 1966–67. He had also been on the council of the Royal Institute of British Architects for ten years from 1951.

John Stillman and John Eastwick-Field wrote together the book The Design And Practice of Joinery, first published in 1958.

The architects Terry Farrell and Nicholas Grimshaw met when working at SEF, before setting up in practice together.

Selected buildings

Ilfracombe School and Community College Ilfracombe, Devon, 1970

References

English designers
Modernist architects from England
Architecture firms based in London
Design companies of the United Kingdom